Word of Mouth is the second studio album by Australian band Matt Finish. The album was released in 1984 and produced the singles "Always Another" (May 1984), "Words and Wars" (June 1984) and "Come On Over" (September 1984). When promoting the album, the band supported U2 on their Under Australian Skies Tour.

Track listing
(All songs by Matt Moffitt except where noted)

 "Out On Those Moments"
 "Tai Ming Money" (Matt Moffitt, Jeff Clayton, John Prior)
 "Come On Over"
 "Light Up My Days"
 "Always Another"
 "Died in Love"
 "Does It Feel" (Moffitt, Prior)
 "Words and Wars"
 "Still Roads (I Need It)" (Moffitt, Prior, Clayton)
 "Blind And Running"

Charts

Personnel
 Matt Moffitt – vocals, guitar
 Jeff Clayton – bass, vocals
 John Prior – drums
 Bertie Dorsett – guitar
 Anthony Smith – keyboards

References

1984 albums
Matt Finish albums